José Junhior Velásquez Huillca (born 29 October 1998) is a Peruvian footballer who plays as a right-back for Peruvian Primera División side Cusco FC.

Club career

Real Garcilaso / Cusco
Living far from Cusco - in Langui - Velasquez had to travel three and a half hours to get to training every day, close to nine hours of travelling daily.

On 8 March 2017, Velásquez got his official debut for Real Garcilaso against Juan Aurich. He started on the bench, before replacing Jhoel Herrera. He played a total of nine league games in that season.

In the following two seasons, Velásquez played 21 league games. Real Garcilaso changed name to Cusco FC for the 2020 season.

Personal life
Velásquez was named after former Alianza Lima-player, José Velásquez, because his father was a huge Alianza fan. Both his brothers is also named José; his older brother is named Frank José and his younger brother is also named José.

References

External links
 

Living people
1998 births
Association football defenders
Peruvian footballers
Peruvian Primera División players
Real Garcilaso footballers
Cusco FC footballers
People from Cusco